Oskar Hennrich was a German First World War fighter ace credited with 20 confirmed aerial victories. As one of the foremost German balloon busters, he destroyed 13 of the crucial intelligence posts despite their being heavily defended.

The victory list

Oskar Hennrich's victories are reported in chronological order, not the order or dates the victories were confirmed by headquarters.
Background information from Above the Lines and The Aerodrome website. Abbreviations were expanded by the editor creating this list.

Citations

Sources

Further readinbg 
 Guttman, Jon. Balloon-Busting Aces of World War 1 . Osprey Publishing, 2005. , 

Aerial victories of Hennrich, Oskar
Hennrich, Oskar